Myersville is a town in Frederick County, Maryland, United States. The population was 1,626 at the 2010 United States Census.

History

The town was incorporated in 1904.

On January 4, 1919, a large fire destroyed many shops and buildings in the center of town.

The Peter of P. Grossnickel Farm was listed on the National Register of Historic Places in 1998.

Capture of the D.C. snipers 

In October 2002, the Washington, D.C. metropolitan area snipers John Allen Muhammad and Lee Boyd Malvo who terrorized the region were apprehended at a rest stop along westbound I-70 in Myersville. The two were discovered when a truck driver recognized their car from police reports.

Geography
Myersville is located at  (39.506627, -77.566271).

The Myersville area is the source of Catoctin Creek, which roughly flows in a "C" loop pattern (northside to eastside to southside) just outside the city limits.

Transportation
The main method of transport to and from Myersville is by road. The main highway that serves the town is Interstate 70, which heads eastward from Myersville to Baltimore and westward to Pittsburgh. Access to Myersville is provided via an interchange with Maryland Route 17, the other highway directly serving the town, which serves western Frederick County on a north–south alignment. U.S. Route 40 passes just to the northeast of the town limits and provides an alternative to I-70 for east–west travelers.

Demographics

2010 census
As of the census of 2010, there were 1,626 people, 531 households, and 437 families living in the town. The racial makeup of the town was 95.1% White, 2.2% African American, 0.2% Native American, 1.3% Asian, 0.2% from other races, and 1.0% from two or more races. Hispanic or Latino of any race were 3.5% of the population.

There were 531 households, of which 49.5% had children under the age of 18 living with them, 70.8% were married couples living together, 8.7% had a female householder with no husband present, 2.8% had a male householder with no wife present, and 17.7% were non-families. 13.2% of all households were made up of individuals, and 6.7% had someone living alone who was 65 years of age or older. The average household size was 3.06 and the average family size was 3.41.

The median age in the town was 38.1 years. 30.8% of residents were under the age of 18; 8.5% were between the ages of 18 and 24; 23.7% were from 25 to 44; 30.1% were from 45 to 64; and 6.9% were 65 years of age or older. The gender makeup of the town was 50.2% male and 49.8% female.

2000 census
At the 2000 census, there were 1,382 people, 439 households, and 378 families living in the town. The racial makeup of the town was 98.48% White, 0.65% African American, 0.07% Native American, 0.29% Asian, 0.43% from other races, and 0.07% from two or more races. Hispanic or Latino of any race were 0.94% of the population.

There were 439 households, of which 57.9% had children under the age of 18 living with them, 76.1% were married couples living together, 9.1% had a female householder with no husband present, and 13.7% were non-families. 11.2% of all households were made up of individuals, and 4.3% had someone living alone who was 65 years of age or older. The average household size was 3.15 and the average family size was 3.44.

The age distribution was 38.7% under the age of 18, 3.0% from 18 to 24, 35.2% from 25 to 44, 16.3% from 45 to 64, and 6.8% who were 65 years of age or older. The median age was 33 years. For every 100 females, there were 100.9 males. For every 100 females age 18 and over, there were 92.9 males.

The median household income was $72,639, and the median family income was $75,768. Males had a median income of $53,125 versus $38,295 for females. The per capita income for the town was $24,207. About 0.5% of families and 0.7% of the population were below the poverty line, including none of those under age 18 and 3.8% of those age 65 or over.

References

Towns in Maryland
Towns in Frederick County, Maryland